The UJI Online Robot is a robot library tool that was created at University Jaume I, Spain in 2004.  It consists
of a robot with three cameras that enable a user to remotely control pickup and placement operations of objects located on a board. The robot is capable of taking voice orders from users, locating, and retrieving books.

External links
"Learning Visual Servoing Techniques by Remotely Programming an Internet Tele-Lab"
Vita of Raul Marin, one of the creators of the robot Lists several publications describing the robot.

Online robots
2004 robots
Robots of Spain